Deh-e Hut (also Romanized as Deh-e Ḩūt; also known as Dehḥūt) is a village in Howmeh Rural District, in the Central District of Kahnuj County, Kerman Province, Iran. At the 2006 census, its population was 949, in 178 families.

References 

Populated places in Kahnuj County